Lesticus lautus is a species of ground beetle in the subfamily Pterostichinae. It was described by Andrewes in 1930.

References

Lesticus
Beetles described in 1930